Yutaka Tani (谷 豊 Tani Yutaka, Malay: Mohd Ali bin Abdullah; November 6, 1911 – March 17, 1942) was a vigilante, local hero, and saboteur who was active in Malaya (now Peninsular Malaysia).

Biography
He was born in Minami-ku, Fukuoka, and moved to Malaya with his family. After he took his education in Japan, his family returned to Malaya, where he lived at Kuala Terengganu where they worked at a shop. There, he converted to Islam after being influenced by the local Malay culture of his friends. He also secretly married a Malay woman, but they later divorced.  In 1931, when he was 20 years old, he returned to Japan for a military inspection. Although he worked for a shoe company, he missed his home and returned to Malaya.

On November 6, 1933, a Chinese man killed and beheaded his two sisters over the Mukden Incident. Seeking revenge against the man and his gang, he became a bandit known as Harimau (Malay word for "Tiger"). Tani attacked some Chinese gangs and British officers, and gave away what he looted from richer officials to the poor, which made him into a local hero. He was then arrested at Hat Yai and imprisoned for two months.

Before World War II, he became a secret agent for the Imperial Japanese Army, sabotaging the British war effort.

He died in Singapore where he is buried in the Japanese Cemetery Park. However, the accounts of his exact death differed: some sources claimed that he was killed during a mission to sabotage a dam at Johor, while others claim that he succeeded in the sabotage, and either died of his wounds or from malaria.

He is also one of the soldiers who were enshrined at the Yasukuni Shrine, in spite of his Muslim faith.

In popular culture
His life story has been depicted in novels and in the films Marai no Tora (1943) and Harimau (1989).

In addition, his treasure is sought after in the Lupin the 3rd: The Pursuit of Harimao's Treasure television special.

References

1911 births
1942 deaths
People from Terengganu
Malaysian people of Japanese descent
Converts to Islam
Japanese spies
Japanese Muslims
Japanese military personnel killed in World War II